Annette Bear-Crawford (1853 – 7 June 1899) was a women's suffragist and federationist in Victoria.

Early life
Bear-Crawford was born in East Melbourne, her family was wealthy and she spent her childhood in Australia and England. She had three brothers and five sisters. Their father believed in giving his daughters 'every educational advantage' and Annette was taught by governesses in Australia and England before attending Cheltenham Ladies' College, Gloucestershire. After some time in France and Germany she trained in social work in England, gaining experience of work in city slums and in London's New Hospital. She met leaders of the women's movement and became well known as an active member of the National Vigilance Association.

Women's suffrage
In April 1890, Bear-Crawford rejoined her mother in Victoria. She became a leading force in the growing women's movement which was then most concerned with gaining the franchise. Bear-Crawford believed that 'the vote would be the most effective instrument for improving conditions of life'. She used her fine organizing abilities to strengthen and eventually unite the existing suffrage societies. With the support of the Woman's Christian Temperance Union (WCTU), she formed the Victorian Women's Suffrage (Franchise) League. Then, on her initiative, the United Council for Women's Suffrage was founded in 1894, with representatives from organizations interested in the cause; she was first president and later honorary secretary. The council lobbied politicians and municipal councillors and organized a monster petition in favour of women's suffrage, but failed to persuade members of the Legislative Council to allow the passage of a franchise bill.

Bear-Crawford also helped to educate women for public work. An accomplished and logical speaker, she trained other women in the art; Vida Goldstein, who accompanied her to meetings, was shown how to handle hecklers and answer questions. Bear-Crawford constantly addressed WCTU and suffrage meetings and also encouraged women to gain election to school boards of advice. She helped to obtain amendments to legislation affecting women, including the raising of the age of consent to sixteen, and the appointment of women as factory inspectors and to the Benevolent Asylum Committee. She also saw the need for police matrons and women to administer the Infant Life Protection Act (1890), and was one of the first members of the Society for Prevention of Cruelty to Children and of the Victorian Vigilance Society. She was a stimulus and inspiration to Victorian feminists of the time. Perhaps her most enduring achievement was the foundation in Melbourne of the Queen Victoria Hospital for Women, which grew out of her concern for the welfare of unmarried mothers and their children; she organized the successful Queen's Willing Shilling fund in 1897 to launch the scheme but did not live to see the hospital opened.

Personal life
In 1894, aged 41, Bear-Crawford had married William Crawford, a solicitor nine years her junior, and was thereafter known as Mrs Bear-Crawford. Her marriage brought her happiness but did little to change the even flow of her life. Beatrice Webb described her as a 'gentle-tempered intelligent woman who keeps me company in the dowdiness of her dress'. Domestic, affectionate and well-read, she had a 'lovable, sunny nature', but as an ardent feminist she believed strongly in women's equality with men; the Age reported in an editorial of 22 September 1897 that she had 'uttered the rather astounding dictum that most things worth having were originally produced by women. Man, she said, is destructive, while woman is constructive'.

In November 1898, after a farewell evening at the Prahran Town Hall, she left for England to attend the Women's International Conference. Her husband joined her in London only three weeks before she died of pneumonia, on 7 June 1899, aged 46. On 4 July a memorial service was held in St Paul's Cathedral, Melbourne; in 1902 a statue was unveiled in London to her memory and, in tribute to her work in England and Australia, her English friends placed a bronze plaque on the wall of Christ Church, South Yarra. In 2007 Bear-Crawford was inducted to the Victorian Honour Roll of Women.

See also
Women and government in Australia

References

1853 births
1899 deaths
Australian suffragists
Activists from Melbourne
Deaths from pneumonia in England
19th-century Australian women
20th-century Australian women